The northern snakehead (Channa argus) is a species of snakehead fish native to China, Russia, North Korea, and South Korea, ranging from the Amur River to Hainan. It has been introduced to other regions, where it is considered invasive. In Europe, the first report of the species was from Czechoslovakia in 1956. In the United States, the fish is considered to be a highly invasive species.

Appearance

The distinguishing features of a northern snakehead include a long dorsal fin with 49–50 rays, an anal fin with 31–32 rays, a small, anteriorly depressed head, the eyes above the middle part of the upper jaw, a large mouth extending well beyond the eye, and villiform teeth in bands, with large canines on the lower jaw and palatines.

Its coloration is a golden tan to pale brown, with dark blotches on the sides and saddle-like blotches across the back. Blotches toward the front tend to separate between top and bottom sections, while rear blotches are more likely to be contiguous. Coloration is nearly the same between juveniles and adults, which is unusual among snakeheads, and is similar to Channa maculata, but can be distinguished by two bar-like marks on the caudal peduncle (where the tail attaches); in C. maculata, the rear bar is usually complete, with pale bar-like areas before and after, while in C. argus, the rear bar is irregular and blotched, with no pale areas around it.

Fish similar in appearance 
Bowfins (Amia calva) are commonly mistaken for northern snakeheads because of similarities in appearance, most noticeably their elongated, cylindrical shape, and long dorsal fin that runs along their backs. Bowfins are piscivorous fish commonly found throughout much of the eastern United States, and in southern Ontario and Quebec. However, unlike bowfin which are native to North America, the northern snakehead is considered an invasive species and environmentally harmful. Some contrasting differences in northern snakehead include the lack of a black eyespot on their caudal peduncle, a golden tan to brown coloration with dark splotches, a longer anal fin, a more elongated head, and an upper jaw that is shorter than its lower jaw. Another noticeable difference is that northern snakehead scales continue uniformly from their body to their head. The northern snakehead has scales that continue uniformly from the body through to their head, whereas bowfin heads are smooth and free of scales.

Behavior
The northern snakehead is a freshwater species and cannot tolerate salinity in excess of 10 parts per million. It is a facultative air breather; it uses a suprabranchial organ and a bifurcated ventral aorta that permits aquatic and aerial respiration.  This unusual respiratory system allows it to live outside of water for several days; it can wriggle its way to other bodies of water or survive being transported by humans. Only young of this species (not adults) may be able to move overland for short distances using wriggling motions. The preferred habitats of this species are stagnant water with mud substrate and aquatic vegetation, or slow, muddy streams; it is primarily piscivorous, but is known to eat crustaceans, other invertebrates, and amphibians.

Reproduction

The northern snakehead can double its population in as long as 15 years. The eggs are fertilized externally; a female can lay 100,000 eggs a year. Fertilization occurs in shallow water in the early morning. Eggs hatch after about 1–2 days, but they can take much longer at lower temperatures.

Subspecies
Two subspecies have been recognized:

 C. a. argus (Cantor, 1842) (Northern snakehead) China and Korea
C. a. warpachowskii Berg, 1909 (Amur snakehead) eastern Russia.

As an invasive species
In Asia, the snakehead fish is considered to be an important food fish. Due to its economic value, C. argus has been introduced (intentionally or not) to several areas in the continental United States. In the U.S., the snakehead is a top-level predator; its introduction poses a substantial threat to native fish populations.

The fish first appeared in U.S. news when an alert fisherman discovered one in a Crofton, Maryland, pond in the summer of 2002. The snakehead fish was considered to be a threat to the Chesapeake Bay watershed, and wary officials took action by draining the pond in an attempt to destroy the species. The action was successful, and two adults and over 100 juvenile fish were found and destroyed.  A man admitted having released two adults, which he had purchased from a New York market, into the pond.

In 2004, 19 northern snakeheads were captured in the Potomac River, and they were later confirmed to have become established (i.e., they were breeding). They are somewhat limited to that stretch of the river and its local tributaries, upstream by the Great Falls, and downstream by the salinity of Chesapeake Bay. Tests found they are not related to northern snakeheads found in other waters in the region, alleviating some concern of their overland migration. Northern snakeheads continue to be caught in the river as of 2012.

The northern snakehead has been found in three counties of Florida, and may already be established there. Apparently unestablished specimens have been found in Flushing Meadows–Corona Park, New York City, two ponds in Philadelphia, a pond in Massachusetts, and reservoirs in California and North Carolina. In 2008, the northern snakehead was found in drainage ditches in Arkansas as a result of a commercial fish-farming accident.  Recent flooding may have allowed the species to spread into the nearby White River, which would allow an eventual population of the fish in the Arkansas and Mississippi Rivers.

In the summer of 2008, an infestation of the northern snakehead was confirmed in Ridgebury Lake and Catlin Creek near Ridgebury, New York.  By August 2008, the New York State Department of Environmental Conservation had collected a number of the native fish, and then poisoned the waters with a liquid rotenone formulation.  After the poisoning, the NYSDEC had to identify, measure, and additionally process the fish to adhere with Bureau of Fisheries procedures before disposal. The treatment plan was operated under several agents, and New York State Police were placed on stand-by in case of protests of local residents of the area.

A new concern is that this fish's spreading is getting close to the Great Lakes, which it may enter and disrupt that ecosystem.

When the snakehead was found in Crofton, the piscicide rotenone was added to the three adjacent ponds. This method of containment killed all fish present in the water body to prevent the spread of the highly invasive snakehead. The chemical breaks down rapidly, and has a half-life in water of 1–3 days.

In 2012, a snakehead was found in a pond in Burnaby, British Columbia, but further study revealed that it had been released three months or less before its capture and it was a blotched snakehead or perhaps a hybrid involving that species. Unlike the northern snakehead, which potentially can establish a population in parts of Canada, the blotched snakehead generally only lives in warmer waters. Before its exact identity was revealed, the province introduced legislation banning the possession of snakeheads and several other potentially invasive species.

In April 2013, sightings of the species in Central Park's Harlem Meer prompted New York City officials to urge anglers to report and capture any individuals. Ron P. Swegman, author of several angling essays on Central Park's ponds, confirmed the species had put both anglers and the New York State DEP on high alert.

In late 2013, authorities in Virginia and Maryland were counting snakeheads in the Chesapeake Bay to better understand the impact of the introduction of the fish to the local ecosystem.  Virginia has criminalized the "introduc[tion]" of snakeheads into the state without specific authorization, although the relevant statute does not explain whether mere importation is sufficient to constitute "introduc[tion] into the Commonwealth" or whether instead release into the environment is required.

In October 2019, multiple snakeheads were found in a pond on private property in Georgia.

In August 2021, a 30-inch snakehead weighing 5 pounds was caught in a reservoir in Canton, Massachusetts.

World record

On the night of May 24, 2018, Andrew “Andy” Fox of Mechanicsville, Maryland shot a northern snakehead with a bow and arrow, which was officially listed as the biggest ever shot according to the Maryland Department of Natural Resources. The record-breaking northern snakehead weighed 19.9 lb, with a length of 35.157 inches. The snakehead was shot near Indian Head, Mattawoman Creek, in Charles County, Maryland.

On May 20, 2014, Luis Aragon of Triangle, Virginia, caught a  northern snakehead, which was officially listed as the biggest ever caught on rod and reel, according to the International Game Fish Association. On May 20, 2016, Emory "Dutch" Baldwin of Indian Head, Maryland boated an  northern snakehead in tidal marshes of the Potomac using archery tackle.  This fish is listed as the state sport record in Maryland by the Department of Natural Resources.

In traditional culture
Northern snakeheads are respected among some Chinese fishermen for their virtue, as parent snakefish are known to sacrifice themselves to protect their young. The young fish are said to rush to feed upon their mother after she gives birth and is temporarily unable to catch prey.

See also
Northern pike

References

Further reading
 
Anonymous. 2005.  2005 World Record Game Fishes. International Game Fish Association, Dania Beach, FL. 400 pp.
Graham, J. B. 1997. Air-breathing fishes: evolution, diversity, and adaptation. Academic Press, San Diego, California, xi + 299 pp

External links

InvadingSpecies.com
 Recognizing Northern Snakehead
 Northern Snakehead
 Species Profile- Northern Snakehead (Channa argus), National Invasive Species Information Center, United States National Agricultural Library. Lists general information and resources for Northern Snakehead.

Northern snakehead
Commercial fish
Amphibious fish
Fish described in 1842
Fish of China
Fish of Korea
Fish of Russia
Taxa named by Theodore Edward Cantor